Auvergne-Rhône-Alpes (ARA; ; ;) is a region in southeast-central France created by the 2014 territorial reform of French regions; it resulted from the merger of Auvergne and Rhône-Alpes. The new region came into effect on 1 January 2016, after the regional elections in December 2015.

It consists of twelve departments and one territorial collectivity (Lyon Metropolis) with Lyon as the prefecture.

This new region combines diverse geographical, sociological, economic and cultural regions, which was already true of Rhône-Alpes, as well as Auvergne, to a lesser extent. While the old Rhône-Alpes and Auvergne regions each enjoyed a unity defined by axes of communication and the pull of their respective metropoles, the new combination is heterogeneous; it sustained lively opposition from some local officials after its creation.

Toponymy, logo and symbols

The text of the territorial reform law gives interim names for most of the merged regions, combining the names of their constituent regions alphabetically, separated by hyphens. Permanent names would be proposed by the new regional councils and confirmed by the Conseil d'État by 1 October 2016.

The interim name of the new administrative region was a hyphenated placename, composed of the historic region of Auvergne, the river Rhône and the French Alps (Alpes). The same name has been chosen as the definitive name, which was officialized by the Conseil d'État on 28 September 2016.

According to several online polls from Lyon Capitale, the name "Rhône-Alpes-Auvergne" led voting, ahead of "Alpes-Auvergne" and "AURA" (an acronym for Auvergne-Rhône-Alpes), which was proposed by Jean-Jack Queyranne, former president of the regional council of Rhône-Alpes.  Schoolchildren were consulted about the name of the new region in February 2016; local residents were consulted in March.

After adjusting the votes in proportion to the number of inhabitants of the regions (Rhône-Alpes having five times the population of Auvergne) the name "Rhône-Alpes-Auvergne" was still leading, ahead of "Auvergne-Rhône-Alpes" and the acronym "AURA".

Despite this result, Laurent Wauquiez and his team decided not to follow the preference of the citizens of the new region, and the name Auvergne-Rhône-Alpes was put to the vote by the regional council and adopted unanimously on 23 June 2016; it was made official on 28 September 2016 through a decree appearing in the Journal Officiel de la République Française.

In October 2017, the region was given a coat of arms that combines those of Auvergne, Savoie, Lyonnais and Dauphiné. The region also has a flag, which initially consisted of the coat of arms on a white background, but was replaced by a heraldic flag in January 2018. On 9 February 2018, the region formalised the flag and the coat of arms on its website, as implemented by Mattieu Casali, a historical scholar. It was received favourably by the national heraldic commission.

In Arpitan and in Occitan, two of the three languages that are historically spoken in the region, the name is pronounced:
 Arpitan:  [];
 Occitan :  [].

Geography

Location 

The Auvergne-Rhône-Alpes administrative region covers an area of 69 711 km2 in the centre and east of the south of France.  It is a collection of regions of diverse topographies, climates, natural resources, cultures, folklore, architecture, and languages.  It is bordered by five other administrative regions: Bourgogne-Franche-Comté to the north, Centre-Val de Loire to the northwest, Nouvelle-Aquitaine to the west, Occitanie to the south-west, and Provence-Alpes-Côte d'Azur to the south-east.  It is also bordered by Italy (Aosta Valley and Piedmont) to the east and Switzerland (Cantons of Geneva, Valais, and Vaud) to the north-east.

Extreme points:
 North: Château-sur-Allier, Allier
 East: Bonneval-sur-Arc, Savoie
 South: Ferrassières, Drôme
 West: Siran, Cantal

Departments 
Auvergne-Rhône-Alpes comprises twelve departments: Ain, Allier, Ardèche, Cantal, Drôme, Haute-Loire, Haute-Savoie, Isère, Loire, Puy-de-Dôme, Rhône and Savoie.

Metropolitan centers 

 Lyon (1,622,331; region prefecture)
 Grenoble (510,368)
 Saint-Étienne (372,308)
 Clermont-Ferrand (264,704)
 Chambéry (186,355)

Important train stations 

 Lyon Part-Dieu 
 Lyon Perrache
 Valence-Ville
 Valence-TGV
 Saint-Étienne-Châteaucreux 
 Grenoble 
 Bourg-Saint-Maurice
 Chambéry-Challes-Les-Eaux  
 Modane
 Clermont-Ferrand
 Geneve Cornavin
 Dabussy

Economy 
The Gross domestic product (GDP) of the region was 270.0 billion euros (327.0 billion dollars) in 2018, accounting for 11.9% of French economic output. GDP per capita adjusted for purchasing power was 30,200 euros or 100% of the EU27 average in the same year. The GDP per employee was 109% of the EU average.

Politics 

The region is governed by the Regional Council of Auvergne-Rhône-Alpes consisting of 204 members. The current regional council was elected in regional elections on 20 and 27 June 2021, with the list of Laurent Wauquiez consisting of The Republicans (LR), and the Union of Democrats and Independents (UDI) securing an absolute majority of 136 seats.

See also 
 Auvergne
 Rhône-Alpes
 Regions of France

Notes

References

External links

Official website
Merger of the regions - France 3

 
Regions of France
France geography articles needing translation from French Wikipedia
Massif Central
States and territories established in 2016